Francis Dennis Ramsay (15 March 1925 – 8 February 2009), known as Dennis Ramsay, was a Scottish portrait painter, trained in London and Paris, who worked mainly in Australia in the classical tradition.

Background and training
A painter in the classical tradition,  Ramsay was born in London of Scottish descent.  He was related to the Scottish artists Allan Ramsay (1713–1784) and James Ramsay (1759–1854).  Towards the end of World War II, he served in the RAF, and in 1952 he made a model of the State Coach which was, exceptionally, accepted by HM Queen Elizabeth II.  This model coach was built as part of an exhibition undertaken in collaboration with Clothilde Highton GMC (Guild of Memorial Craftsmen), an Australian painter and sculptor living in Arundel, Sussex between 1946 and 1952, whose husband, an officer of the Royal Navy, had been killed in WWII.  (The late) Lavinia, Duchess of Norfolk gave Clothilde and Dennis the use of a room in Arundel Castle in which to carry out their work.

His formal training included reading Architecture at University College London and three years’ study in Florence (1953–1955) as a pupil of Pietro Annigoni (1910–1988), the internationally renowned grande maestro portrait painter of the 20th century (Annigoni subsequently became a godfather to Ramsay's younger son, Justin).

Media and technique
Ramsay's training included drawing, both in pencil and in china ink, as well as water colour.  However, much of his time as a pupil of Annigoni involved oil tempera (or tempera grassa, i.e. egg-oil) – originally a 16th-century technique which entails meticulous time consuming work and which was revived in Italy during the 1930s by Dr Nikolai Lokoff (Николай Николаевич Лохов 1872–1948 ), an exiled Russian industrial chemist and amateur painter.  With the egg acting as an emulsifier, the technique allows water to be mixed with the paint thereby enabling the production of ultra-fine subtle glazes.  However, as the paint is not commercially available, the artist must mix his own colours using pigment powders, oil, varnish, egg yolk and a preservative;  uniquely, Ramsay discovered that Scotch whisky is an excellent preservative for the egg in the oil tempera mix!  The result is work of permanence and colours that seem to glow with clarity and vitality.  For all but the largest pictures his oil tempera works are painted on wooden panels, usually prepared with a heavy-duty paper lining glued to the panel.  The survival after 500 years of early Flemish paintings with all their glorious luminous quality bears testament to the permanence of oil tempera as a medium.  The process also involves the production of a ‘cartoon’ in pencil which is then transferred to the panel.

Range of work

Of his first one-man show in London in 1955, The art critic of The Times described Ramsay's work as “beyond reproach”.  During the intervening years he has covered a vast field of subjects ranging from a 9 x 6 ft painting of The Resurrection to a 3 x 2in study of a leaf described by one critic as “easily mistaken for a Ruskin” - it has long been acknowledged that his still life paintings bear comparison with the Dutch and Flemish masters of the 15-17 th centuries.

Though his still life and religious work is highly figurative, he does not treat that as an end in itself, but rather as a means of expressing more clearly a wide range of subjects and emotions – from the simple faith of a peasant's humble shrine to a piece of fruit, or the innocence of a child in his drawings.

In 1965 the Church Times described his treatment of the great religious themes as being “painted with extraordinary technical accomplishment in terms relevant to the present age, but of deep spirituality”.

More recently he was described by the prominent Australian art dealer, Tom Silver, as being “… the best living still life artist in Australia in old master technique.  In fact, there are only a few living artists worldwide who are capable to produce this class.”  In 2004 Martin Gallon, the British fine art expert, commented  “His close attention to detail is reminiscent of the work of the Pre-Raphaelites whose principal aim was to paint from nature as closely as possible;  in Ramsay's work, one can see resonances of this aim, yet its simplistic beauty and close observation challenges our senses.  These are restful images and their quality demands respect:  the message is one of enjoyment.  To convey an enjoyment of our natural surroundings and the delicacies of nature is very much Ramsay's mantra …”

He has painted three Royal portraits:  HRH Princess Alexandra (1955), HM King Faisal of Iraq (1957) and HRH Prince Philip (2001), commissioned to celebrate his 80th birthday.  Portraits of other notable personalities include Sir Winston Churchill, Sir Robert Menzies and Dame Flora MacLeod of MacLeod (the late 28th Chief of that clan).

Today Ramsay combines his still life work with that of his portraiture;  the latter still ranges from formal portraits to classical drawings of adults and children.

His works are now found in many public and private collections throughout Europe, USA, Canada and Australia, including those of several churches, universities, schools and even banks.

Exhibitions

2005		Delshan Gallery, Melbourne
2004		Cotham Gallery 101, Melbourne
2001		Adam Galleries, Melbourne:  Dennis Ramsay "Classical Light"
1994-2000	Tom Silver Fine Art, Melbourne & Sydney - annual exhibitor
1999		The Hawksburn Gallery, Melbourne
1995 & 1996	Duke Gallery, Melbourne
1980-1994	Balmoral Galleries, Geelong - annual exhibitor
1964-1985	Old Maine Gallery, Seattle - annual exhibitor
1975 & 1976	Van der Straeten Galleries, New York
1974		Pieter Wenning Gallery, Johannesburg
1961		Galleries of the Federation of British Artists, London:  Paintings and Drawings by Pietro Annigoni (with 3 other past pupils)
1956-60's	Royal Academy London - frequent exhibitor
1956-60's	Royal Portrait Society London - frequent exhibitor
1955 & 1956	Arthur Jeffress Gallery, London

Passing on the tradition

On a rather smaller scale than Annigoni, Ramsay has sought to pass on his skills and expertise, especially at his London studio during the 1960s and 70's.  Of the small band of pupils who have studied with him, most notable may be Helen de Borchgrave who went on to train with Professor Ruhemann, Chief Restorer of the National Gallery, London;  since 1968 she has cleaned and restored oil paintings for museums, churches, institutions and private owners.  Helen is a member of the Association of International Art Critics and has contributed articles to many prominent publications;  her first book A Journey into Christian Art was published in 1999.

However, Ramsay considers that his greatest triumph was the complete conversion of one Henry Campbell.  Henry was a “qualified Art master” of fourteen years’ standing, teaching and practising abstract art;  under Ramsay's guidance he became devoted to the unpretentious, but rewarding path of honest painting and drawing.

References

External links
Dennis Ramsay at Australian Art
"Dennis Ramsay Obituary"

20th-century Scottish painters
Scottish male painters
21st-century Scottish painters
21st-century Scottish male artists
Scottish portrait painters
1925 births
2009 deaths
Royal Air Force personnel of World War II
20th-century Scottish male artists